Shim Seo-yeon (born 15 April 1989) is a South Korean footballer who plays as a defender for Seoul City WFC.

Club career
In November 2017, Shim signed with Incheon Hyundai Steel Red Angels and was given the number 14 shirt. On 23 April 2018, she made her debut in a 0–0 draw with Gyeongju KHNP.

Honours

Club
Suwon FMC
 WK League: 2010

International
 Summer Universiade Gold medal: 2009
 Asian Games Bronze medal: 2010, 2014
 Peace Queen Cup: 2010

References

External links
 WK League Player record 
 Shim Seo-yeon at Asian Games Incheon 2014

1989 births
Living people
South Korean women's footballers
South Korea women's under-17 international footballers
South Korea women's under-20 international footballers
South Korea women's international footballers
Women's association football defenders
Suwon FC Women players
Incheon Hyundai Steel Red Angels WFC players
WK League players
2015 FIFA Women's World Cup players
Footballers at the 2010 Asian Games
Footballers at the 2014 Asian Games
Footballers at the 2018 Asian Games
Asian Games bronze medalists for South Korea
Asian Games medalists in football
Medalists at the 2010 Asian Games
Medalists at the 2014 Asian Games
Medalists at the 2018 Asian Games
Universiade gold medalists for South Korea
Universiade medalists in football
Medalists at the 2009 Summer Universiade
21st-century South Korean women